The following is a list of individuals associated with Smith College through attending as a student, or serving as a member of the faculty or staff.

Notable alumnae
The Alumnae Association of Smith College considers all former students to be members, whether they graduated or not, and does not generally differentiate between graduates and non-graduates when identifying Smith alumnae.

Academia
 Mira Hinsdale Hall, 1883, Founder of Miss Hall's School
 Otelia Cromwell, 1900, first African-American woman to receive a Yale degree, Educator
 Elisabeth Irwin, 1903, Founder of Little Red School House
 LaWanda Cox, 1934, M.A., noted Historian of slavery and reconstruction at Hunter College
 Laura Bornholdt, 1940, historian and dean at Sarah Lawrence College, University of Pennsylvania, and Wellesley College
 Jean Harris, 1945, notable for work with female inmates after serving time herself
 Margaret Hutchins, 1906, reference librarian and professor at Columbia University
 Sally Katzen, 1964, law scholar, civil servant
 Susan Low Bloch, 1966, Professor at Georgetown University Law Center, member of the American Law Institute
 Diana L. Eck, 1967, Professor of Comparative Religion and Indian Studies and Master of Lowell House at Harvard University
 Catharine MacKinnon, 1968, American feminist, scholar, lawyer, teacher and activist
 Neda Maghbouleh, B.A. 2004, American-born Canadian sociologist, scholar, writer, author, and educator; the Canada Research Chair in Migration, Race, and Identity and associate professor of sociology at the University of Toronto Mississauga.
 Laura D'Andrea Tyson, 1969, professor at Haas School of Business of UC Berkeley, Former and First Female Director of National Economic Council, former Chair of Council of Economic Advisors, First Female Dean of London Business School
 Amy Richlin, 1970, Professor in Department of Classics at UCLA
 Denise Spellberg, 1980, scholar of Islamic history

College Presidents
 Ada Comstock, 1897, third and first full-time President of Radcliffe College
 Rhoda Dorsey, 1946, longest serving and first woman President of Goucher College
 Mary Patterson McPherson, 1957, sixth President of Bryn Mawr College, former Vice President of the Andrew W. Mellon Foundation, Executive Officer of American Philosophical Society
 Elizabeth Hoffman, 1968, 20th President of the University of Colorado System
 Nancy A. Roseman, 28th President of Dickinson College
Victoria Murden McClure, 1985, President of Spalding University

Activism
 Blanche Ames Ames, 1899, President of the Class of 1899, portraitist, women's rights activist, and inventor
 Jennifer Chrisler, 1992, Executive Director of Family Equality Council
 Alice T. Days, documentary filmmaker
 Betty Friedan, 1942, author of The Feminine Mystique, Co-Founder and First President of National Organization for Women, renowned feminist
 Yolanda King, 1976, activist and daughter of civil rights leader Martin Luther King Jr.
 Susan Lindauer, 1985, American journalist and antiwar activist
 Kathleen Ridder, Philanthropist, educator, writer, equality for women activist
 Jean Gurney Fine Spahr (1861-1935), social reformer associated with the Rivington Street Settlement
 Gloria Steinem, 1956, Founder of Ms. (magazine), founding editor of New York Magazine, noted feminist and political activist
 Helen Rand Thayer (1863-1935), co-founder and president of the College Settlements Association
 Mary van Kleeck 1904, social feminist
 Gertrude Weil, 1901, activist of women's suffrage, labor reform and civil rights

Arts
 Gina Knee Brook, artist
 Miriam Davenport, 1937, painter and sculptor who played a central role in helping European Jews escape the Holocaust
 Eleanor de Laittre, artist
 Alison Frantz, archeological photographer and academic
 Merrill Garbus, 2001, founder, lead singer and instrumentalist for Tune-Yards
 Thelma Golden, 1985, Board of Obama Foundation and Chief Curator of the Studio Museum in Harlem
 Shelley Hack, 1969, actress and model
 Sarah P. Harkness, 1937, American architect
 Rose Jang, pop opera singer, PR ambassador for Korean Tourism Office and UNESCO of Korea 
 Mimi Kennedy, 1970, actress
 Diana Kleiner, 1969, art historian
 May Lillie, 1886, Wild West Show performer and equestrian
 Kathleen Marshall, 1985, three-time Tony Award-winning choreographer
 Deborah Nehmad, 1974, American attorney and artist
 Cornelia Oberlander, 1944, landscape architect
 Maya Deren, U.S. avant-garde filmmaker and film theorist of the 1940s and 1950s
 Toks Olagundoye, actress, ABC TV sitcom The Neighbors
 Judith Raskin, 1949, Metropolitan Opera Soprano
 Romita Ray, 1992, art historian
 Pauline Gibling Schindler, 1915, Los Angeles arts figure
 Sandy Skoglund, 1968, artist
 Mary Otis Stevens, 1949, architect
 Patricia Wettig, 2001, actress and playwright, Brothers & Sisters
 Inez Harrington Whitfield, 1889, Arkansas-based botanical illustrator
 Alice Morgan Wright, sculptor, suffragist, advocate of animal rights
 Carolyn Kuan, conductor, pianist, music director for Hartford Symphony Orchestra
 MJ Long, joint architect of the British Library
Desiree Akhavan, filmmaker and actress, Appropriate Behavior and The Miseducation of Cameron Post

Authors
 Natalie Babbitt, 1954, Newbery Medal Honor-winning author of Knee-Knock Rise and Tuck Everlasting
 Joanna Barnes, 1956, actress and author
 Mildred Grosberg Bellin, 1928, cookbook author
 Dorothy Hamilton Brush, 1917, author, birth control advocate and women's rights advocate
 Ernestine Gilbreth Carey, 1929, author of Cheaper by the Dozen
 Ann Downer, 1982, writer
 Margaret Edson, 1983, Pulitzer Prize-winning American playwright of Wit
 Edith Granger, author of Index of Poetry
 Laurie Ann Guerrero, writer and Texas poet laureate
 Svava Jakobsdóttir, Icelandic author, politician and women's rights activist
 Piper Kerman (class of 1992) author of Orange is the New Black
 Tosca Lee, 1992, best-selling author of Demon: A Memoir and Havah: The Story of Eve
 Pearl London, American poet and teacher 
 Madeleine L'Engle, 1941, Newbery Medal Honor-winning author of A Wrinkle in Time
 Erin Morgenstern, 2000, author of The Night Circus
 Anne Morrow Lindbergh, 1928, author of Gift from the Sea, pioneering American aviator and spouse of Charles Lindbergh
 Annie Russell Marble, 1886, 1895, author and essayist
 Sarah MacLean, 2000, bestselling author of young adult and romance novels
 Ann Matthews Martin, 1977, Newbery Medal Honor-winning author of The Baby-Sitters Club
 Olive Beaupré Miller (née Olive Kennon Beaupré), 1904, an American author, publisher and editor of children's literature
 Ruth Ozeki, 1980, Japanese American novelist and filmmaker
 Margaret Mitchell, 1922, left Smith shortly after her mother's death, 1937 Pulitzer Prize-winning author for Gone with the Wind
 Sylvia Plath, 1955, poet, novelist, and author of The Bell Jar and Ariel
 Halina Poświatowska, 1961, Polish poet and writer: one of the most important figures in modern Polish literature
 Olive Higgins Prouty, 1904, Author of Now, Voyager and Stella Dallas
 Anna Chapin Ray, 1885, prolific author of juvenile and adult literature.
 Cynthia Propper Seton, 1948, novelist, nominated for the National Book Award
 Martha Southgate, 1982, award-winning author
 Dorothy Hayden Truscott, international champion bridge player and author
 Yoshiko Uchida, 1944, Japanese American writer
 Cynthia Irving Voigt, 1963, Newbury Medal-winning author
 J.R. Ward, bestselling author of romance novels
 Diane Wolkstein, children's author and folklorist
 Hanya Yanagihara, author of A Little Life
 Jane Yolen, 1963, author and editor of almost 300 books

Business
 Shelly Lazarus (class of 1968): former CEO and Chairman of Ogilvy & Mather
 Enid Mark, 1954, Founder of the ELM Press
 Christine McCarthy, 1977, CFO of The Walt Disney Company
 Phebe Novakovic, Chairman and CEO of General Dynamics
 Marilyn Carlson Nelson, former chairman and CEO of the Carlson Companies and former chair of the National Women's Business Council
 Durreen Shahnaz (class of 1989): Founder of Impact Investment Exchange (IIX), the world's first social stock exchange

Diplomats and Government Officials
 Barbara Pierce Bush, 1947, 43rd First Lady of the United States (did not graduate, left college in 1945 to marry George H. W. Bush)
 Leecia Eve, 1986, Deputy Secretary for Economic Development in the Executive Chamber of New York Governor, Senior Policy Adviser to U.S. Sen. Hillary Rodham Clinton during her 2008 primary campaign for President
 Judith Fergin, 1973, former United States Ambassador to East Timor
 Louka Katseli, Greek Minister of Economy, Competitiveness and Shipping
 Maria Lopez, 1975, Cuban-American former judge and a former television jurist
 Anne Clark Martindell, former United States Ambassador to New Zealand
 Helen Milliken, 1945, longest-serving First Lady of Michigan
 Emily W. Murphy, 1995, Administrator of the General Services Administration
 Stephanie Neely, Treasurer of City of Chicago
 Farah Pandith, 1990, Special Representative to Muslim Communities for U.S. Department of State
 Nancy Reagan, 1943, 42nd First Lady of the United States
 Sherry Rehman, former Pakistan Ambassador to the United States
 Mary Scranton, 1940, former First Lady of Pennsylvania (1963–1967)
 Julianna Smoot, Deputy Campaign Manager, Obama for America, former White House Social Secretary

Senators, Congresspersons, and other Politicians
 Barbara Adams, General Counsel of Pennsylvania
 Tammy Baldwin, 1984, first openly gay U.S. Senator, former U.S. House of Representative of Wisconsin's 2nd District
 Becca Balint, 1990, Majority Leader of the Vermont Senate
 Deborah Bergamini, 1993, Member of the Italian Parliament
 Leanna Brown, 1956, first Republican woman elected to the New Jersey Senate
 Emily Couric, 1969, late Virginia State Senator and sister of American television journalist Katie Couric
 Mattie Daughtry, 2009, Democratic Assistant Majority Leader of the Maine Senate representing the 24th District
 Jane Lakes Harman, 1966, President of the Woodrow Wilson International Center for Scholars, U.S. House of Representative of California's 36th District
 Maureen Ogden, 1950, seven term member of the New Jersey General Assembly
 Niki Tsongas, 1968, U.S. House of Representative of Massachusetts's 5th District

Journalism and Media
 Julia McWilliams Child, 1934, Primetime Emmy Award and Peabody Award-winning host of The French Chef, renowned chef, and author of Mastering the Art of French Cooking
 Patience Cleveland, 1952, film and television actress
 Molly Ivins, 1966, populist American newspaper columnist, political commentator, humorist and bestselling author
 Meg Greenfield, 1952, Pulitzer Prize-winning journalist, Editorial Writer for the Washington Post and Newsweek
 Sara Haines, 2000, co-Host of The View (U.S. TV series), ABC News correspondent
 Stephanie Cutter, co-host of CNN's Crossfire, Chief Spokesperson for the Obama-Biden Transition Project, Senior Advisor for President Obama's Presidential Campaign
 Ruth Sulzberger Holmberg, 1943, newspaper publisher
 Marylin Bender, 1944, first female business editor of The New York Times
 Sally Quinn, 1963, author and journalist for The Washington Post
 Nina Munk, 1988, journalist, author, and Contributing Editor at Vanity Fair
 Kate O'Brian, President of Al Jazeera America
 Shirley Fleming, American music critic and editor
 Margaret Petherbridge Farrar, 1919, American journalist and first crossword puzzle editor for New York Times
 Danielle Pletka
 Sharmeen Obaid-Chinoy, 2002, Pakistan's first Oscar winner, Academy Award and Emmy-winning documentary filmmaker for Saving Face and journalist
 Sarah Hampson, 1979, Canadian journalist and columnist for The Globe and Mail 
 Adrian Nicole LeBlanc, 1986, author of Random Family, freelance journalist
 Doan Hoang, 1994, award-winning Vietnamese-American film producer, screenwriter, and director
 Lara M. Schwartz, 1992, music video producer
 Anne Mollegen Smith (née Anne Rush Mollegen), 1961, first woman editor-in-chief of Redbook
 Lynne M. Thomas, 1996, Hugo Award-winning science fiction editor and curator
 Anne Froelick, blacklisted screenwriter
 Cynthia Wade, Academy Award-winning documentary filmmaker for Freeheld
 Julia Scott, 2002, NPR and The New York Times
 Helaine Olen, journalist and author
 Erin Cressida Wilson, screenwriter
 Desiree Akhavan, 2007, Sundance Grand Jury Prize-winning filmmaker

Law
 Cynthia Bashant, 1982, judge of the United States District Court for the Southern District of California
 Joan B. Gottschall, 1969, judge of the United States District Court for the Northern District of Illinois
 Carolyn Dineen King, 1959, first female and former Judge of the United States Court of Appeals for the Fifth Circuit
 Dorothy Miner, 1958, chief counsel of the New York City Landmarks Preservation Commission
 Jane Richards Roth, 1956, judge of the United States Court of Appeals for the Third Circuit
 Stephanie Kulp Seymour, 1962, judge of the United States Court of Appeals for the Tenth Circuit

Philanthropy
Eunice Blake Bohanon, 1925, children's book editor
Sarina Prabasi, Chief Executive Officer of WaterAid America
Wendy Schmidt, 1977, President of Schmidt Family Foundation

Pulitzer Prize Winners
 Margaret Mitchell, 1922, 1937 Novel for Gone with the Wind
 Sylvia Plath, 1955, 1982 Poetry for The Collected Poems (awarded posthumously)
 Amy Ellis Nutt, 1977, 2011 Feature Writing
 Meg Greenfield, 1978 Editorial Writing
 Margaret Edson, 1983, 1999 Drama for Wit (play)

Sciences
 Caroline Thomas Rumbold, (1877 –1949), botanist
 Sara Bache-Wiig, 1918, botanist and mycologist
Harriet Boyd-Hawes, 1892, pioneering American archaeologist, nurse and relief worker
Dorcas Brigham, 1918, botanist and horticulturist
Betty Hay, (1927-2007), cell and developmental biology, M.D. degree from Johns Hopkins School of Medicine, first female to head a department (Anatomy & Cellular Biology) at Harvard Medical School
 Judy Clapp, 1951, computer scientist
 Diane G. Cook, 1965,  Parkinson’s disease patient advocate and researcher
 Mary Foster, biochemist
 Carolyn Kaelin, 1983, breast cancer surgeon 
Helena Chmura Kraemer, American biostatistician
 Susan Goldin-Meadow, 1971, developmental psychologist
 Ng'endo Mwangi (Florence), 1961, Kenya's first woman physician
 Martha Austin Phelps, (1870-1933), chemist
 Margaret Robinson, biologist
 Erin K. O'Shea, sixth President of Howard Hughes Medical Institute
 Florence R. Sabin, 1893, first Female to hold full professorship at Johns Hopkins School of Medicine, be elected to National Academy of Sciences, and to head a department at the Rockefeller Institute for Medical Research.
 Julia Warner Snow (1863–1927), biologist
 Jane Stafford, 1920, chemist
 Jane C. Wright, 1942, pioneering oncologist and surgeon

Other Notables
 Frances Carpenter, 1912, daughter of photographer Frank Carpenter
 Kory Stamper, 1996, lexicographer and associate editor for the Merriam-Webster dictionary
 Jeannie Cho Lee, first ethnic Asian Master of Wine
 Penny Chenery, 1943, American Sportswoman, bred and raced Secretariat, the 1973 winner of the Triple Crown 
 Julie Nixon Eisenhower, 1970, second daughter of 37th U.S. President Richard Nixon
 Jean Harris, spent time in prison for killing her boyfriend of 14 years, Herman Tarnower, who was the author of The Complete Scarsdale Medical Diet
 Sarah Thomas, 1970, research librarian
 Ann Axtell Morris, archaeologist, artist, and author who largely worked in the U.S. southwest and Mexico
 Tori Murden, 1985, first woman to make a solo crossing of the Atlantic Ocean by rowboat
 Tei Ninomiya, 1910, first Asian graduate of Smith College
 Eunice Carter, 1921, first female African-American assistant district attorney for the state of New York, pivotal in the prosecution of Mob Boss Charles "Lucky" Luciano
 Charlotte Samuels, swimmer, youngest person to complete the Triple Crown of Open Water Swimming
Shirley Zussman, 1934, sex therapist

Fictional alumnae
 Emily Gilmore, from the television series Gilmore Girls
 Ainsley Hayes, from the television series The West Wing
 Joanna Kramer, from the 1979 film Kramer vs. Kramer
 Charlotte York, from the television series Sex and the City
 Dr. Cristina Yang, from the television series Grey's Anatomy
 Piper Chapman, from Netflix Original Series Orange is the New Black
 Selina Meyer, from the HBO television series Veep

Presidents of the College
 Kathleen McCartney (2013–present)
 Carol T. Christ (2002–2013)
 John M. Connolly (acting president 2001–2002)
 Ruth J. Simmons, first African-American president (1995–2001)
 Mary Maples Dunn (1985–1995)
 Jill Ker Conway, first woman president (1975–1985)
 Thomas C. Mendenhall (historian)  (1959–1975)
 Benjamin Fletcher Wright (1949–1959)
 Herbert Davis (1940–1949)
 Elizabeth Cutter Morrow (acting president 1939–1940)
 William Allan Neilson (1917–1939)
 Marion LeRoy Burton (1910–1917) WEF
 Laurenus Clark Seelye (1875–1910)

Notable administrators, faculty and staff (past and present)
 Alice Ambrose - professor of philosophy
 Newton Arvin - literary critic
 Leonard Baskin - artist
 Ben Baumer, statistician and sabermetrician 
 Amy Bernardy, journalist, taught Italian at Smith from 1903 to 1910 
 Nina Browne - librarian, archivist, and inventor of Browne Issue System
 Mary Ellen Chase - professor of English
 Henri Cole - poet
 Sylvia Plath - poet
 Anita Desai - author
 Donna Robinson Divine
 Alfred Einstein - musicologist
 Stanley Elkins - professor of history
 Hallie Flanagan - director and playwright
 Jean Garrigue - poet
 Judith Gordon - pianist
 Domenico Grasso - founding director, Picker Engineering Program
 William Francis Ganong - botanist
 Heloise Hersey - professor of English
 Denis Johnston - professor of philosophy
 Klemens von Klemperer - professor of history
 Karen Klinger - rower and Smith crew head coach
 Kurt Koffka - psychologist
 Helen Lefkowitz Horowitz - historian
 G. E. Moore - professor of philosophy (1940-1941)
 Barry Moser - artist and illustrator
 Eric Reeves - professor of English
 Laura Woolsey Lord Scales - Dean of Students (1923–1944)
 Roger Sessions - composer
 David Staines - literary critic
 David Peck Todd - astronomer
 Thomas Tymoczko - philosopher
 Kurt Vonnegut - author
 Allen Weinstein - Archivist of the United States
 Eleanor Wilner - poet and editor
 Dorothy Maud Wrinch - mathematician
 Chien-Shiung Wu - physicist
 Andrew Zimbalist - economist

References